Jennie Linda Marie Åfeldt (born 30 August 1974) is a Swedish politician who has served in the Riksdag since 2014 as a member of the Sweden Democrats.

In parliament, Åfeldt has sat on the Committee on the Environment, Public Health and Consumer Policy and the Social Affairs Committee. Along with fellow SD politician Christina Östberg, she has campaigned for drug reform and tough policies against substance addiction. In 2015, Åfeldt was a victim of identity theft and compromised parliamentary security when a perpetrator broke into her hotel room in Malmö and stole all of her identification documents.

References 

Living people
1974 births
Members of the Riksdag from the Sweden Democrats
Members of the Riksdag 2014–2018
Members of the Riksdag 2018–2022
Women members of the Riksdag
21st-century Swedish women politicians